The 2019 Women's Hockey Varsity Hockey will be the 9th edition of the Varsity Hockey, the annual tournament women's field hockey championship of South Africa.

In addition to the Power Play rule seen in previous seasons of Varsity Hockey, whereby each team can select to implement a two-minute period where goals count two and the opposition must bench two players, field goals will now count two.

Venues
Following is a list of all venues and host cities.

Results

Preliminary round

Fixtures
All times are local (UTC+2).

Seven place game

Fifth place game

Knockout stage

Semi-finals

Final

Final standings

Goalscorers

Awards
The following awards were given at the conclusion of the tournament.

References

Hockey
Field hockey competitions in South Africa
Varsity Hockey (South Africa)